Ohi-ike is an earthfill dam located in Aichi Prefecture in Japan. The dam is used for irrigation. The catchment area of the dam is 2 km2. The dam impounds about 9  ha of land when full and can store 901 thousand cubic meters of water. The construction of the dam was started on 2003 and completed in 2010.

References

Dams in Aichi Prefecture
2010 establishments in Japan